The thoracic spinal nerve 12 (T12) is a spinal nerve of the thoracic segment.

It originates from the spinal column from below the thoracic vertebra 12 (T12).

It may also be known as the subcostal nerve.

References

Spinal nerves